James David Grout (22 October 1927 – 24 June 2012) was an English actor of radio and television. He was best known for playing Chief Superintendent Strange in Inspector Morse.

Early life
Grout was born in London, the son of Beatrice Anne and William Grout. He trained to be an actor at RADA.

Career
His BBC Radio 4 appearances include Barliman Butterbur in the 1981 adaptation of The Lord of the Rings, headmaster Harry Beeston in all ten series of the Radio 4 comedy series King Street Junior (1985–1998), Professor Richard Whittingham in Andy Hamilton's Hell-based comedy Old Harry's Game (1995–2003), Rev. Timothy Corswell in The Secret Life of Rosewood Avenue (1991) and Any Other Business (1995). 

Some of his television credits include Dai Owen in Looking For Clancy (1975), Jonas Bradlaw in Murder Most English (1977), Superintendent Rafferty in Turtle's Progress (Series 1 only), Div. Supt. Albert Hallam in Juliet Bravo (1981), The Doctor in Shelley (1982), Mr McAllister in The Beiderbecke Affair (1984), the Inspector in The Box of Delights (1984), Professor George Bunn in A Very Peculiar Practice (1988), Granville Bennett in All Creatures Great and Small, Chief Superintendent Strange in Inspector Morse and Mr. Justice Ollie Oliphant in Rumpole of the Bailey as well as the "chief whip" in Yes Minister. He also played William Rowland in "The Girl on the Train" in The Agatha Christie Hour (1982).  He was nominated for a 1965 Tony Award for Best Supporting or Featured Actor (musical) for Half a Sixpence.

Other TV roles include George Batt in Mother Love (1989), based on the novel by Laura Black and starring Diana Rigg, David McCallum and James Wilby and also Mr Spenlow in David Copperfield for two episodes in 1999.

Personal life
Grout married Noreen, a schooldays sweetheart. In 1977, they moved on a whim from west London to Malmesbury, Wiltshire, where he contributed a column to the local paper, the Wiltshire Gazette and Herald.

He died on 24 June 2012, aged 84, at the Ashgrove nursing home in Purton, Wiltshire, after a long illness.

References

External links

James Grout in Theatre Archive, University of Bristol

1927 births
2012 deaths
20th-century English male actors
Alumni of RADA
English male radio actors
English male television actors
Male actors from London
People from Malmesbury